First Christian Church, also known as the Wabash Christian Church, is a historic Disciples of Christ church located at Wabash, Wabash County, Indiana.  It was built in 1865, and is a rectangular, brick Romanesque Revival style church. It has a gable roof and features a domed tower rising from the slightly projecting center pavilion at the front facade.

It was listed on the National Register of Historic Places in 1983.  It is located in the West Wabash Historic District.

References

External links
 Wabash Christian Church website

Historic district contributing properties in Indiana
Churches on the National Register of Historic Places in Indiana
Romanesque Revival architecture in Indiana
Churches completed in 1865
Buildings and structures in Wabash County, Indiana
National Register of Historic Places in Wabash County, Indiana
Wabash, Indiana